Sitcom is a 1998 French surrealistic satire film written and directed by François Ozon. The story documents the moral decline of a once esteemed suburban family, whose descent into degeneracy begins with the purchase of a small white rat.

The film's name is a direct reference to American sitcoms, which are noted for their focus on traditional family values and whimsical humour.

Plot
The patriarch (François Marthouret) of a seemingly normal nuclear family returns home one day with a small white rat. The animal soon has an adverse effect on his wife (Évelyne Dandry) and children, influencing them into enacting their darkest, most hidden desires.

The son, Nicolas (Adrien de Van) loudly announces his homosexuality and begins throwing wild orgies, the daughter Sophie, (Marina de Van) deliberately flirts with death and practices sadomasochism on her boyfriend (Stéphane Rideau), while the mother seduces her son so she can "cure" him of his orientation. After the father eventually kills and devours the offending rat, he turns into one himself; when his family discover this, they band together and brutally slay him.

Cast
 Évelyne Dandry (billed as Evelyne Dandry) as The mother / La mère
 François Marthouret as The father / Le père
 Marina de Van as Sophie
 Adrien de Van as Nicolas
 Stéphane Rideau as David
 Lucia Sanchez as Maria
 Jules-Emmanuel Eyoum Deido as Abdu
 Jean Douchet as Psychotherapist / Le psychothérapeute
 Sébastien Charles as Boy with the zucchinis / Le garçon aux courgettes
 Vincent Vizioz as Guy with red hair / Le garçon aux cheveux rouges
 Kiwani Cojo as Pierced guy / Le garçon au piercing
 Gilles Frilay as Guy with mustache / L'homme moustachu
 Antoine Fischer as Gregory / Le petit garçon

Possible influences
 In John Schlesinger's notorious film Midnight Cowboy, a mother and her son's deeply concealed sexual frustrations surface after she produces a small, white rubber mouse.
 Another inspiration could be Pier Paolo Pasolini's novel, and eventual film, Teorema, which depicts the arrival of a mysterious, unnamed stranger in the home of an upper-class Italian family. He systematically seduces every single member of the dysfunctional household, including the mother, who becomes nymphomaniac as a result, the father, the daughter, whom he leaves in a catatonic state, and the son, who subsequently realises his homosexuality and becomes an artist.

See also
 Queer Cinema

External links
 

1998 films
French black comedy films
French LGBT-related films
Films directed by François Ozon
LGBT-related black comedy films
Incest in film
1990s French films